Ernests Mālers (6 February 1903 – 1 February 1982) was a Latvian cyclist. He competed in the team pursuit event at the 1928 Summer Olympics.

References

External links
 

1903 births
1982 deaths
Latvian male cyclists
Olympic cyclists of Latvia
Cyclists at the 1928 Summer Olympics
People from Tukums